Li Dashi (570–628), born in Anyang, was a Chinese historian, and an officer during the Sui and Tang dynasties. He began the History of the Northern Dynasties and History of the Southern Dynasties, which were completed by his son, Li Yanshou.

570 births
628 deaths
Sui dynasty historians
Tang dynasty historians
7th-century Chinese historians
Sui dynasty politicians
Tang dynasty politicians from Henan
Politicians from Anyang
Historians from Henan
Writers from Anyang